Haemodracon riebeckii is a species of lizard in the family Phyllodactylidae. The species is endemic to Yemen.

Etymology
The specific name, riebeckii, is in honor of German ethnologist Emil Riebeck.

Geographic range
H. riebeckii is found on Socotra Island and nearby Samhah Island. Both Islands belong to Yemen.

Habitat

Behavior
H. riebeckii is active at night.

Reproduction
H. riebeckii is oviparous.

References

Further reading
Boulenger GA (1885). Catalogue of the Lizards in the British Musem (Natural History). Second Edition. Volume I. Geckonidæ ... London: Trustees of the British Museum (Natural history). (Taylor and Francis, printers). xi + 436 pp. + Plates I-XXXII. (Phyllodactylus riebeckii, pp. 94–95).  
Peters W (1882). "Über die von Herrn Dr. E. Riebeck auf Socotra gesammelten Reptilien ". Sitzungsberichte der Gesellschaft naturforschender Freunde zu Berlin 1882 (3): 42–46. (Diplodactylus riebeckii, new species, pp. 43–44). (in German and Latin).
Rösler H, Wranik W (2004). "A key and annotated checklist to the reptiles of the Socotra archipelago". Fauna of Arabia 20: 505–534.

Haemodracon
Lizards of Africa
Endemic fauna of Socotra
Taxa named by Wilhelm Peters
Reptiles described in 1882